Vietnam News Agency (VNA;  (TTXVN)) is the official state-run news agency of the Socialist Republic of Vietnam. It operates more than 30 foreign bureaux worldwide and maintains 63 bureaux in Vietnam — one for each city and province, including 6 in ASEAN. The current General Director of TTXVN is Nguyễn Đức Lợi. It also operates the website VietnamPlus.

History
The Vietnamese News Agency (TTXVN) was founded on 23 August 1945 shortly after the August Revolution. On 15 September 1945, Ho Chi Minh's Declaration of Independence of Vietnam and the Provisional Revolutionary Government of Democratic Republic of Vietnam member list were broadcast through the TTXVN in Vietnamese, English and French. 
Not long after the launch, in 1946, VNA opened its first foreign news bureau in Bangkok (Thailand)
At 20:00, 19 December 1946, Vietnam News Agency transmit the Appeal for National Resistance, compiled by President Ho Chi Minh. The Agency concomitantly evacuate all of its infrastructural properties into the resistance area.
In 1947, VNA transmitted the Chinese-language news called Việt Nam Tân văn (Chinese: 越南新闻; pinyin: Yuenan Xinwen). This bulletin was later halted on the following year.
In 1948, VNA opened the second foreign bureaux in Yangon (Myanmar)
Vietnam News Agency begun to receive the news from big information agencies such as ITAR-TASS (Soviet Union, later Russia), Xinhua (China) since 1949. Two years later, the bureau of the Agency in Moscow, Beijing and Paris has been opened.
In 1954, the Anti-French Resistance War ended. VNA relocated the headquarters back to Hanoi. 
In 1960, the Liberation News Agency was founded to broadcast news in South Vietnam.
On May 24, 1976, the Vietnamese News Agency and the Liberation News Agency were merged into the new Vietnam News Agency. 
On May 12, 1977, the National Assembly Standing Committee of the Socialist Republic of Vietnam issued a resolution approving the change of the Vietnamese name of the agency from “Việt Nam Thông tấn xã” into “Thông tấn xã Việt Nam”. 
On June 13, 1982, VNA issued Tin Nhanh Espana 82 (España '82 Flash News), a special publications to provide the coverage of World Cup 1982. Two months later, the weekly newspaper Văn hóa & Thể thao Quốc tế (International Culture & Sports) was established on the basis of the España '82 Flash News. The original publish days of the newspaper were every Fridays.
The second weekly newspaper of the VNA, Tuần Tin Tức (Weekly News), was launched on May 14, 1983, circulating every Saturdays. This publication was renamed simply to Tin Tức (The News) from 1 January 1999 following the merger of Tuần Tin tức and Tin tức Buổi chiều (Afternoon News), another publication of the VNA.
In 1991, VNA begins the publication of Việt Nam News, a national English-language daily.
From 1994 the VNA began to operate and own Le Courrier du Vietnam, the French-language daily newspaper from the Ministry of Culture and Information
In 2008, the VietnamPlus website was launched, which published news in Vietnamese, English, French and Spanish.
On 21 June 2010, the Vietnam News Agency Television Channel (V NEWS) went on experimental broadcast. The channel was officially launched on 25 August, with launching ceremony was attended by then-Prime Minister Nguyễn Tấn Dũng.
From December 31, 2016, the Tin Tức newspaper ceased the daily edition and relaunch the weekend edition back to its original name Tuần Tin tức after eighteen-year hiatus.

Products

Vietnam News Agency oversees the following publicatioins and programmes:

 Print publications:
Tin tức, with weekly edition on Thursdays and News on Ethnic Minority and Mountainous Regions on Tuesdays
 Thể thao & Văn hoá, with weekday print version, monthly magazine Thể thao & Văn hoá – Đàn ông
 Ethnic Minority and Mountainous Region Pictorial, a monthly periodical published in 11 minority languages of Vietnam
 Vietnam Pictorial, a magazine published in 10 foreign languages
 Dep, a monthly magazine
 Vietnam-Korea Times, a weekly Korean-language periodical
 Vietnam and World Economics, a periodical
 Viet Nam News (published six days a week) and Viet Nam News Sunday
 Le Courrier du Vietnam, a weekly French-language magazine
 Vietnam Law & Legal Forum, a monthly English-language magazine
 Official Gazette, an English translation of legal bulletin Công báo, published thrice-weekly
 Websites:
 vnanet.vn, an online news portal
 vietnam.vnanet.vn, the electronic edition of Vietnam Pictorial
 vietnamlaw.vnanet.vn, the electronic edition of Vietnam Law & Legal Forum
 Bnews.vn, a business news website
 baotintuc.vn, the electronic edition of Tin tức
 VietnamPlus at vietnamplus.vn
 thethaovanhoa.vn, the electronic edition of Thể Thao & Văn Hoá
 dantocmiennui.vn, the electronic edition of Ethnic Minority and Mountainous Region Pictorial
 vietnamnews.vn, Ovietnam.vn, and Bizhub.vn, publications of Viet Nam News
 VietnamPlus, an online newspaper
 Television:
 VNEWS TV Channel
 Television programmes Economic Focus, Message from History, Moments and Events, Vietnam and International Friends, and Studying Uncle Ho’s moral example every day
 Affiliated with Thể thao & Văn hoá: Culture Panorama, Planet of Sports, and Culture Radar
 Affiliated with Le Courrier du Vietnam: Francophone Space

References

External links
Official site of the Vietnamese News Agency
V News channel

1945 establishments in Vietnam
Government agencies established in 1945
News agencies based in Vietnam